The Ebenezer Crocker Jr. House is a historic house located in Barnstable, Massachusetts.

Description and history 
Built in 1783, it is the oldest house currently standing in Cotuit village. It is a -story wood-frame structure, with a five bay facade. It has corner pilasters, and is extended by two ells, one of which may be older than the main block. The house has a long association with the locally prominent Crocker family, and is accompanied by well-preserved outbuildings.

The house was listed on the National Register of Historic Places on November 10, 1987.

See also
National Register of Historic Places listings in Barnstable County, Massachusetts

References

External links
 MACRIS Listing - Ebenezer Crocker Jr. House

Houses in Barnstable, Massachusetts
National Register of Historic Places in Barnstable, Massachusetts
Houses on the National Register of Historic Places in Barnstable County, Massachusetts
Georgian architecture in Massachusetts
Houses completed in 1783